Mark Steven Hepburn (born 29 August 1968) is a former Australian rules footballer who played with North Melbourne, the West Coast Eagles and the Sydney Swans in the Victorian/Australian Football League (VFL/AFL).

North Melbourne recruited Hepburn from Claremont and he was used initially as a forward in the VFL. He kicked a goal with his first kick in league football, against St Kilda at Moorabbin Oval. Hepburn, who could also play as a key defender, was North Melbourne's leading ruckman in the 1989 and 1990 seasons, with the most hit-outs each year.

He requested a trade to West Coast in 1991 but spent just two seasons with his new club before being delisted when they had to trim their squad. After a year spent traveling overseas, Hepburn was picked up by Sydney with selection 57 in the 1993 AFL draft but would only make seven appearances.

References

1968 births
Australian rules footballers from Western Australia
Claremont Football Club players
Living people
North Melbourne Football Club players
People educated at Hale School
South Fremantle Football Club players
Sydney Swans players
West Coast Eagles players
Western Australian State of Origin players